Richard Leonard (born 1962) is the former Leader of the Scottish Labour Party.

Richard Leonard may also refer to:
Richard M. Leonard (1908–1993), American rock climber and environmentalist
Dick Leonard (1930–2021), British writer, journalist and politician
J. Rich Leonard (born 1949), American judge
Richard Leonard (Canadian football) (born 1991), Canadian football player
Richard Leonard (bowls), Irish lawn bowls champion

See also
Rick Leonard (born 1996), American football player